The Calderone glacier is a glacier located in the Apennine Mountains in Abruzzo, Italy. Found in the Gran Sasso d'Italia mountain group, it lies just beneath the Corno Grande, the highest peak in the Apennines.

With the disappearance of the Corral de la Veleta glacier in the Sierra Nevada in 1913, "Il Calderone" became one of Europe's southernmost known glaciers (42°28′N, 13°33′E), being slightly to the north only compared to Snezhnika (latitude of 41°46′09″ N) and Banski Suhodol Glaciers in Pirin Mountain in Bulgaria. If present deglaciation trends continue, the Calderone may soon disappear as well. The discovery of a number of small glaciers in the Accursed Mountains in 2009 seemed to threaten Calderone's positions.

Historical surface of the glacier

In 1794, the Calderone had an estimated  volume of over 4 million cubic metres; by 1916, the glacier’s volume had decreased to 3.3 million cubic metres, and by 1990, it had decreased to 360,931 cubic metres. In 1998 Italian glaciologists at a symposium in L'Aquila predicted  that the Calderone  would vanish within a couple decades.

Some glaciologists have predicted that the glacier will disappear by 2020. However, 2014 has been slightly positive for the glacier. By the end of August 2014, the volume of residual ice was larger than during the same period in 2013. It disappeared in 2016 after droughts.

References

Glaciers of Italy
Mountains of Abruzzo
Apennine Mountains